"One Way Ticket Home" is a 1970 song by Phil Ochs, an American singer-songwriter best known for the protest songs he wrote in the 1960s.

"One Way Ticket Home" is the first song on Greatest Hits, which—despite its title—was a collection of new songs. Musically, it signals a return by Ochs to his musical roots in country music and early rock and roll.

In the song, Ochs announces that he wants to buy a "one-way ticket home". Inspired by a recent Elvis concert in Las Vegas, Ochs declares "Elvis Presley is the king/I was at his crowning." But something is wrong: "My life just flashed before my eyes/I must be drowning." Referring to the political climate in the United States, Ochs says he "would be in exile now/But everywhere's the same" and decides he wants a "one-way ticket home".

References

1970 songs
1972 singles
Phil Ochs songs
Songs written by Phil Ochs